Via Transportation, Inc. is a global public transport, logistics, and Transit Tech company headquartered in New York City. Via was founded in 2012. Via licenses its technology to cities, transportation authorities, school districts, universities, and private organizations to help build their own technology-driven transportation networks. It operates in partnership with over 400 local governments across more than 20 countries globally, including the United States, United Kingdom, Canada, Israel, Germany, France, Australia, New Zealand, Singapore, Japan, Brazil, Finland, Spain, Italy, Switzerland, and the United Arab Emirates.

In October 2020, Via acquired the logistics company Fleetonomy to accelerate its entry into the last-mile deliveries industry. In March 2021, Via purchased the transportation planning platform Remix for $100M to create the first end-to-end Transit Tech platform for cities and transit agencies.

Business overview 
Via operates as a software as a service (SaaS) technology company for all forms of transportation. Specific divisions include public transportation planning and operations, paratransit operations, non-emergency medical transportation, logistics and deliveries, school bus fleet routing, commercial ridesharing, and autonomous vehicles.

Via 
Via is a transportation services technology provider primarily focused on delivering on-demand and pre-scheduled shared rides, optimizing fixed routes, and providing multimodal and intermodal transit technology. Via's algorithm matches multiple passengers heading in the same direction and books them into a single vehicle. Shared rides are usually from corner-to-corner to streamline vehicle routes, requiring passengers to walk to a nearby pickup point, indicated on the app. Select cities also offer private rides, as well as direct door-to-door transportation.  

Via primarily operates in partnership with a local transit authority, government entity, university, school district, taxi fleet or private organization. Via licenses its ride-sharing technology through Software as a Service (SaaS) and Transportation as a Service (TaaS) agreements.

The operational partnerships use Via's technology, but allow organizations to use their own vehicle fleets, supply their own drivers, and provide their own live service staff. Partners may also choose to have Via supply these resources, including full vehicle and operational management.

Via has partnerships with some of the world's largest public transportation providers, including Berliner Verkehrsbetriebe (BVG) in Berlin, King County Metro in Seattle, and Transport for London, Transport for New South Wales (TfNSW) in Australia.

Remix 
Via acquired Remix Software, Inc. in March 2021. Remix is a collaborative mapping platform for transportation service planners, allowing users to visualize transit data, and analyze community and cost impacts of new designs to assess tradeoffs of service planning decisions.

Remix enables the exploration of demographic data in cities around the world. The software can highlight the disproportionate impact of transportation projects.In November 2021, Via announced On-demand Planning within the Remix platform. The software allows cities and transit agencies to use an array of city, transit, and demographic data to visualize how and where on-demand transit solutions can work within their existing fixed-route transit network.

Paratransit 
Via offers ADA complementary paratransit services, partnering with transit authorities and operators to offer its technology as software-as-a-service, or manage full operations, including drivers, vehicles, and customer service. The automatic dispatching technology allows for on-demand and pre-scheduled rides using wheelchair-accessible vehicles, as well as dynamic routing.

In January 2020, the Transportation District Commission of Hampton Roads (HRT) in Norfolk, Virginia awarded Via with a multi-year paratransit contract. HRT provides paratransit services under direction of the Americans with Disabilities Act.

In August 2020, amid the COVID-19 pandemic, Via partnered with Green Bay Metro in Green Bay, Wisconsin to replace their previous paratransit technology and provide commingled microtransit and paratransit service to a community of over 200,000 residents.

School bus routing and tracking 
Via unveiled its school bus routing and tracking platform on August 21, 2019, after winning a contract with the New York City Department of Education, the largest school district in the United States.

Via for Schools is the first integrated, automated school bus routing, tracking, and communication platform in the world. Parents and students will have the ability to track, in real-time, their bus’ whereabouts and receive frequent and reliable communications in the event of service changes, improving safety, achieving operational efficiencies and reduce transportation costs.

Via Logistics 

Via Logistics specializes in last-mile deliveries including route planning, managing a fleet, and dispatching drivers and packages to customers.

Corporate shuttles 
In July 2018, Via partnered with Mori Building Company to launch HillsVia, an on-demand shared transportation network for the company's employees in Tokyo. The service marked Via's first venture in Japan, and first corporate shuttle network. Via later announced a new service called BlueVia in Tokyo in September 2019. The on-demand shuttle network is in cooperation with Nihon Kotsu, one of the largest taxi and limousine operators in Japan. BlueVia allows Itochu employees to hail a ride on-demand during their daily commutes and between meetings.

Autonomous vehicle technology
Via debuted its autonomous vehicle technology for the first time at CES 2019 alongside Aurrigo, Comet Mobility and an AI technology provider. Via's autonomous technology is strongly influenced by the company's history in ridesharing, with multiple passengers using a self-driven vehicle.

The demonstration worked by booking a PodZero using the Via app. Via's autonomous vehicle technology can book and route the autonomous vehicles on-demand, provide customers with a vehicle location and ETA, and use its Augmented Reality (AR) functionality for easy identification.

Via announced its first public autonomous vehicle deployment called BusBot on July 11, 2019. The driverless vehicle began serving residents on April 8, 2019, at an Australian retirement community in Toormina, a suburb of Coffs Harbour. Via partnered with local bus operator Busways, Transport for NSW, and technology provider EasyMile to operate BusBot. The deployment marks the second phase of BusBot's pilot program, with plans to operate in the community for 22 weeks, giving Via and its partners time to test increasingly advanced AV elements.

In October 2019, Via unveiled BotRide, one of the world's first shared, on-demand, autonomous vehicle service operating on public roads. BotRide launched in partnership with Hyundai and Chinese autonomous startup Pony.ai. The free pilot project began service on November 4, 2019, in Irvine, California with a fleet of self-driving Hyundai KONA Electric SUVs, hailed and directed using the Via-powered BotRide mobile application.

Throughout 2021, Via partnered with May Mobility to launch three autonomous vehicle services in eight months. The partnership started in August with the launch of RAPID, an autonomous vehicle public transportation deployment in Arlington, Texas covering Downtown Arlington and the University of Texas at Arlington (UTA) campus. Via and May Mobility later launched similar services in Grand Rapids, Michigan in August and Ann Arbor, Michigan in October.

Airports shuttles 
In November 2019, Via partnered with the Port Authority of New York and New Jersey (PANYNJ) and announced a pilot program to launch LGA Connect, a new flat-rate shared ride service from LaGuardia Airport to all five New York City boroughs. The deal would be the first of Via's partnerships with airports to reduce private vehicle trips by offering congestion-reducing, convenient and affordable shared rides as part of public transit. More than 30 million travelers flew through LaGuardia Airport in 2018, and more than 90 percent of those travelers used private vehicles, individual taxis and similar methods of travel that contribute to stagnating traffic.

History

Via 
Via was established following the founders' experience with Sherut shared taxis in Israel. The service was launched exclusively in the Upper East Side of Manhattan in 2013, expanding to cover between 110th Street and 14th Street by April 2015, and then all of Manhattan by October 2015. Further expansion to Chicago was announced in November 2015. In August 2016, it was launched in Washington D.C.

In June 2017, Via partnered with Curb to allow users to hail a yellow taxi for a shared ride in certain areas of Manhattan.  In November 2017, Via partnered with the city of West Sacramento to deploy a fleet of Mercedes-Benz vans to function as a hybrid of ride share and buses. Via's presence in West Sacramento was part of a one-year trial grant from the Sacramento Area Council of Governments. That same month, Via expanded in New York to cover all of Brooklyn.

In January 2018, the company extended service to all five New York City boroughs.  At the same time, the company partnered with Keolis Downer to launch The Newcastle Transport On Demand App in Australia using Via's on-demand shared rides as part of Newcastle Transport's bus and ferry network. In March 2018, the partnership, called Keoride, expanded to include Macquarie Park, a suburb of Sydney. In October 2019, the service zone expanded again to give inner-city residents a new option to reach key central business district locations, and to connect with other modes of transport such as the Newcastle Interchange, light rail, existing bus services and Broadmeadow station.

Singapore's Land Transport Authority awarded a contract to Via in collaboration with the Ministry of Movement to run a trial of on-demand buses in February 2018. The six-month trial called BusGo launched in December of that year, receiving positive public response. In March 2018, Via partnered with the city of Arlington, Texas to operate 10 vans as shuttles for Arlington residents, with a possibility to expand the trial citywide; taxpayers funded the partnership with $922,500 in its first year.  In June 2018, Marin Transit launched an on-demand shared shuttle service in a partnership with Via. The service operates in Marin County in the San Francisco Bay Area. The following month the company partnered with Mori Building Company to launch HillsVia, an on-demand shared transportation network for the company's employees in Tokyo. The service marked Via's first venture in Japan.

In August 2018, Via entered a licensing agreement with Harvard University to bring Via's ridesharing technology to the university's evening van service. The service is limited to Harvard students, faculty, and staff.

Via expanded its Washington, D.C. service to neighboring Arlington County, Virginia in August 2018.

In November 2018, Via partnered with Auckland Transport and Go Bus to launch AT Local, a first- and last-mile transport solution in New Zealand. The all-electric fleet of vans and cars transport passengers to-and-from the local Devonport, Bayswater and Stanley Bay ferry terminals.

The Los Angeles County Metropolitan Transportation Authority partnered with Via in November 2017. The LA Metro service provides first- and last-mile transportation surrounding three major stations offering Via shuttles with subsidized fares that can be paid through the public transportation fare card TAP accounts. The service was funded through a grant from the Federal Transit Administration.

In February 2019, Via partnered with the city of Lone Tree, Colorado to provide pairing technology for their Microtransit service, Link on Demand.

Via also announced the first deployment of its technology in South America in February 2019. The company deployed CityBus 2.0 in Goiânia, Brazil in partnership with local public transit operator HP Transportes Coletivos. The CityBus 2.0 launch made Goiânia the first city in Latin America to introduce a fully flexible on-demand shuttle system operated by a public transit operator. In July 2019, CityBus 2.0 expanded to 13 new neighborhoods in Goiânia.

In April 2019, Via and Digiasia Bios announced a new on-demand transit network in Bekasi, Indonesia called TRON. Operated by PT. Teknologi Rancang Olah Nusantara, the service aimed to reinvigorate declining use of Angkot in Indonesia.

Later that month, Via, Mori Building Company and Itochu collectively announced a strategic partnership to create Via Japan. On the same day, Via began its on-demand service called bubble in Tel Aviv, Israel in partnership with public transit operator Dan Transportation. The service began April 15, 2019 in Tel Aviv and the surrounding cities of Ramat Gan and Givatayim.

Following announcements in Japan and Israel, Via, King County Metro, Sound Transit and the City of Seattle began service in Seattle and Tukwila, Washington. The microtransit network offers a public transportation link surrounding five Sound Transit Link light rail stations: Mount Baker, Columbia City, Othello, Rainier Beach, and Tukwila International Boulevard.

At the end of April 2019, Via expanded service zone in Chicago by more than 20 percent to begin offering shared rides in Evanston and West Chicago.

In May 2019, Via and local public transit operator SamTrans launched SamTrans OnDemand in Pacifica, California.

Later in May 2019, Via announced a new partnership with the Washington, D.C. Department of Public Works to offer rides to District employees, as well as an expansion of its existing service to Alexandria, Virginia. The expansion increased Via's service zone in the D.C. metro area by 33 percent.

In June 2019, Via expanded its footing in Australia by launching another on-demand public transportation network called Cooee in The Ponds and Schofields, two suburbs of Sydney. The network is designed to connect more people to the Sydney Metro as a first- and last-mile service. In September 2019, the company reported residents took more than 20,000 rides on the Cooee service in less than three months, saving more than 21,000 vehicle kilometers by sharing a ride compared to driving a private vehicle, and saving nearly five metric tons of  vehicle emissions. Cooee was also Australia's first demand-responsive transportation provider to fully integrate with Opal Connect, a new account-based ticketing system by Transport for NSW.

The same month, Via launched its first on-demand service specifically designed for senior citizens called Newton in Motion, or NewMo, in Newton, Massachusetts. The service is dedicated to residents over 60 years old who need rides to medical appointments, meaning there are wheelchair accessible vehicles to act as the City of Newton's paratransit service.

Via launched in Austin, Texas with a new service called Pickup on June 25, 2019, in partnership with Capital Metropolitan Transportation Authority. The on-demand network replaced Cap Metro's former MetroBus Route 470 in Manor, just outside of Austin. Cap Metro expanded Pickup's service zone in September 2019 to serve four other areas in Austin included in the MetroLink pilot program.

The same day in June 2019, Via also launched an on-demand network called Ride on Flex in partnership with the Montgomery County Department of Transportation in Maryland. The service marked yet another deployment in the Washington D.C. area, linking residents in Montgomery County to the DC Metro.

Via later announced a partnership with Hampton Jitney to offer flat-rate Via airport transfers and discounted rides to Hampton Jitney stops in Manhattan.

On July 9, 2019, Via announced the appointment of Charles H. Rivkin to its board of directors. Rivkin is the chairman and CEO of the Motion Picture Association of America (MPAA) and has more than 30 years of experience as a media executive and leading U.S. diplomat.

Via announced its first public autonomous vehicle deployment called BusBot on July 11, 2019. The driverless vehicle began serving residents on April 8, 2019, at an Australian retirement community in Toormina, a suburb of Coffs Harbour. Via partnered with local bus operator Busways, Transport for NSW, and technology provider EasyMile to operate BusBot. The deployment marks the second phase of BusBot's pilot program, with plans to operate in the community for 22 weeks, giving Via and its partners time to test increasingly advanced AV elements.

Also in July, Via launched COTA Plus, an on-demand public transportation deployment in Columbus, Ohio in partnership with the Central Ohio Transit Authority. Following the partnership in Columbus, Via announced another on-demand transit partnership in Fort Worth, Texas called ZIPZONE. The partnership marked Via's third major city deployment in Texas following both Arlington and Austin.

On August 5, 2019, Via launched “Rapid On Demand,” a new paratransit network in Grand Rapids, Michigan. The partnership marked  one of the first times an American transit agency will upgrade its paratransit service with on-demand ride hailing technology, as opposed to pre-scheduling days in advance.

Later that week, Via announced it expanded its service zone in Chicago citywide. Nearly doubling the size of the current operating zone, the expansion included several parts of the city least served by existing public transportation, supplementing the existing transit by providing first-and-last-mile connection for riders to-and-from all Chicago Transit Authority (CTA) and Metra stations.

Via unveiled its school bus routing and tracking platform "Via for Schools" on August 21, 2019, after winning a contract with the New York City Department of Education, the largest school district in the United States. Via for Schools is the first integrated, automated school bus routing, tracking, and communication platform in the world.

At the end of August 2019, Via announced a new partnership with the city of Sault Ste. Marie, Ontario, marking the company's second deployment in Canada and first in Ontario. The service "Sault Ste. Marie On-Demand" launched in September 2019 and utilizes the city's existing bus fleet.

In September 2019, Via announced it will power a new transit deployment in partnership with Northeastern University, a global research university in based in Boston. Called "RedEye," the dynamically routed transit network marks one of the first universities in North America to integrate ride hailing technology into its campus shuttle system. Later that month, Via announced a new partnership with Northwestern University, making it the third major university to use Via's technology to develop on-demand student shuttles following Harvard and Northeastern University.

Via Japan also announced a new service called BlueVia in Tokyo in September 2019. The on-demand shuttle network is in cooperation with Nihon Kotsu, one of the largest taxi and limousine operators in Japan. BlueVia allows Itochu employees to hail a ride on-demand during their daily commutes and between meetings.

At the end of September 2019, Via announced new on-demand public transportation services in both Jersey City, New Jersey and Birmingham, Alabama. Jersey City Mayor Steven Fulop cited a lack of funding from NJ Transit when announcing his plans to develop a new form of public transportation for the New York-adjacent metropolis. The service in Birmingham launched in December, and Jersey City planned to begin operations in 2020.

In October 2019, the City of Cupertino, California announced that it chose Via to develop a new on-demand public transportation system, providing more efficient connections to the CalTrain and increase access to public transit across the city. Cupertino, with a population of 60,000 residents, balloons to approximately 150,000 people during the weekdays as a result of a huge influx of commuters, most of them headed to the city's largest employer, Apple. The new Apple Park campus has more than 11,000 parking spaces, with parking occupying more square feet than the spaceship-like building.

In November 2019, Via partnered with the District of Columbia Mayor's Office for Veterans Affairs (MOVA) and the Department of For-Hire Vehicles (DFHV) to launch VetsRide, an on-demand shared ride program that provides veterans with access to free transportation to medical, educational, employment, and other opportunities.

Later that month, Via announced its first service in Utah in partnership with Utah Transit Authority (UTA). Called UTA On-Demand, the dynamically routed public transportation system connects residents to suburban areas of Salt Lake City including Bluffdale, Draper, Herriman, Riverton and South Jordan. The project intends to further enhance connectivity to TRAX and FrontRunner lines, as well as to key business districts and important destinations in the community.

At the end of November 2019, Via and Environment Canterbury announced a new partnership to overhaul public transportation in Timaru, New Zealand, replacing fixed-route transportation with on-demand, dynamically routed transit. The service will begin with a two-month pilot phase in February 2020, followed by an official roll-out in April 2020.

In December 2019, Via partnered with Brazilian transit operator Sindiônibus to launch TopBus+ in Fortaleza, making it Via's second on-demand public transportation network in Brazil. At launch, riders can request a ride anywhere within the Centro region, Iracema Beach, Aldeota, Mucuripe, Varjota, Papicu, City 2000, Cocó, Joaquim Távora, Fatima, Benfica, as well as some major shopping malls and area universities.

In 2020, Via debuted its paratransit solution and signed key contracts with the Transportation District Commission of Hampton Roads (HRT) in Norfolk, Virginia and Green Bay Metro in Green Bay, Wisconsin.

In October 2020, Via acquired the logistics company Fleetonomy to accelerate its entry into the last-mile deliveries industry. In March 2021, Via purchased the transportation planning platform Remix for $100M to create the first end-to-end TransitTech platform for cities and transit agencies. By 2021, Via had more than 500 TransitTech deployments in more than 35 countries around the world including the United States, Germany, and United Kingdom.

In November 2021, Via completed a $130M Series G round of financing at a $3.3B valuation. The round was led by Janus Henderson, and had participation from several other funds including Blackrock, ION, and Koch Disruptive Technologies. These funds join existing investors including Exor, 83North, Broadscale Group, Ervington Investments, Hearst Ventures, Planven Ventures, Pitango, and RiverPark Ventures. In December 2021, Via discontinued the last of their remaining direct-to-consumer rideshare operations to focus the business exclusively on the growing TransitTech business. Via also announced that the business had surpassed an annual revenue run rate of $100M.

ViaVan 
In September 2017, Via formed a joint venture with Mercedes-Benz Vans to establish ViaVan, designed to spread on-demand shuttle services in Europe. ViaVan launched its first operations in March 2018 in Amsterdam. In January 2021, Via changed its European name from ViaVan to Via. The company is now known solely as Via throughout Europe and around the world.

Arriva UK Bus launched ArrivaClick, an on-demand app developed through a partnership with Via, in Kent in March 2017. Via launched Savy, an app using Via's on-demand ride-sharing technology and a fleet of vehicles owned by the company, in Queenstown, New Zealand in November 2017.

In December 2017, ViaVan announced a new partnership with the Berliner Verkehrsbetriebe (BVG) and Mercedes-Benz Vans to establish the largest public sector on-demand transit deployment in the world. Named BerlKönig, the Berlin fleet would contain 300 vehicles and would be launched in spring 2018.

In April 2018, ViaVan launched in London and operated initially in central London Zones 1 and 2.

ViaVan launched in Milton Keynes, Buckinghamshire in October 2018, making it the company's fourth deployment in Europe.

In February 2019, ViaVan announced a new partnership with Transport for London (TfL) for a 1-year demand responsive bus pilot in the borough of Sutton. The service operates in collaboration with Go-Ahead London and uses dynamically routed, on-demand buses.

In April 2019, ViaVan and Arriva launched the third deployment of ArrivaClick in the Drummond Estate development in Leicester, England, one of the largest new housing developments in the East Midlands. The partnership also represents the first time in the UK that a Section 106 agreement has been used to fund a digitised Demand Responsive Transport (DRT) service.

In May 2019, ViaVan partnered with Transport for London (TfL) to launch an on-demand public transportation pilot in Sutton. The demand-responsive bus service operated by Go-Ahead aims to link more people to existing TfL transit and reduce the need for private car ownership.

ViaVan reported it had successfully completed the pilot phase of an on-demand, dynamic corporate shuttle at the Mercedes-Benz Bremen plant in Bremen, Germany on June 28, 2019. Due to the success of the pilot program, ViaVan and Mercedes-Benz announced they would be launching additional corporate campus solutions at other Mercedes-Benz plants.

In July, 2019, ViaVan launched Malta's first-ever ridesharing service called Cool. The service covered 28 Maltese neighborhoods at launch, with plans to expand to the entire island nation.

ViaVan also received a three-year license renewal from Transport for London in July, 2019. The company announced it provided more than 7 million rides in London since launching, saving 3 million vehicle kilometers by pooling multiple passengers into shared vehicles, resulting in more than 600,000 kilograms of  saved.

ViaVan announced a new public transportation deployment on behalf of Berliner Verkehrsbetriebe (BVG) in August 2019 called “BerlKönig BC” serving as first-and-last-mile connection to U-Bahn railway stations traditionally underserved by fixed route services. BerlKönig BC is the second service ViaVan and BVG have worked on together, following on the heels of their first BerlKönig service, which launched in central Berlin in September 2018.

In September 2019, ViaVan announced its first dynamically routed transit solution in Finland in partnership with the Helsinki Regional Transport Authority (HSL). The service operates in Espoo, allowing riders to book an on-demand trip and connect to Metro and train stations in the operating zone.

In October 2019, ViaVan launched the UK's first fully electric fleet serving on-demand shared rides in Milton Keynes. The service began by adding five electric Mercedes-Benz Vito  to its fleet with plans to expand the fleet of on-demand shuttles to thirty electric vehicles by 2020. The funding through Milton Keynes Council supports the Department for Transport's initiatives around Ultra Low Emission Vehicles, which aims to help cities meet targets for reducing carbon emissions and provide an efficient and sustainable on-demand service for passengers.

Later that month, ViaVan began operating the third public sector deployment of its technology for on-demand shared rides in Germany in the City of Bielefeld. Called Anton, the on-demand public transportation service is a direct partnership with local public transit operator moBiel, the company behind Germany's Bielefeld Stadtbahn.

In November 2019, ViaVan partnered with the Netherland-based oil and gas company Shell to launch a fast-charging shared electric mobility project in Amsterdam. The program integrates ViaVan's on-demand technology and operations, “Shell Recharge” technology, and charging station infrastructure.

In May 2020, ViaVan partnered with Transport for Wales to launch a demand-responsive transport service called Fflecsi in Wales. It operates as a pilot project across various principal areas of Wales, with operations expanding through 2021. It was launched during the COVID-19 pandemic in Wales to provide public transport for key workers during lockdowns, a physically distanced transport service, and improving the transport connections in many rural areas of Wales.

References

Transport companies established in 2012
Companies based in New York City
Ridesharing companies of the United States
Demand responsive transport